Shauna S. Roberts (born September 17, 1956 in Beavercreek, Ohio) is an American science fiction author, science writer and medical writer.

Personal background and education
In addition to Ohio, Roberts has lived in Pennsylvania, Illinois, Iowa, the District of Columbia and New Orleans.  She now resides in Riverside, California. She received her B.A. in Anthropology from the University of Pennsylvania in 1977, and her Ph.D. in Anthropology from Northwestern University in 1984.  She attended the Clarion Writers Workshop in 2009. She is a current member of the Orange County Science Fiction Club.

Science and medical writing
Roberts was editor of the American Association for the Advancement of Science's Guide to Biotechnology Products And Instruments from 1986 to 1989, and wrote for The Journal of NIH Research, from 1989 to 1990.

Her nonfiction works outnumber her fiction credits, which are more recent. She wrote the American Diabetes Association's award-winning patient newsletter, The Diabetes Advisor, during its entire period of publication (1993–1999).  She co-authored Basic Demographic Observations on Free-Ranging Rhesus Monkeys (with Donald Stone Sade, Diane Chepko-Sade, Jonathan M. Schneider, and Joan T. Richtsmeier) (1985) and The Commonsense Guide to Weight Loss for People with Diabetes (with Barbara Caleen Hansen) (1999).  She has written numerous articles in such venues as Diabetes Forecast, Diabetes Care, Diabetes Self-Management, The Journal of NIH Research, Science, The FASEB Journal, Analytical Chemistry, Modern Drug Discovery, Veterans Health System Journal, Ocular Surgery News, Oncology News International, Caring Today, and The Bark.

Fiction writing
Roberts's published short stories include:

"Slipping Into Love", in the anthology Pleasure of the Heart and Other Stories (2002).
"Insipid Love Songs", Fables (August 2003).
"My Father's New Wife", Andromeda Spaceways Inflight Magazine (February/March 2004).
"Hero Home", in the anthology Clash of Steel, Book One: Reluctant Hero. (2005).
"The Hunt", Continuum Science Fiction (Fall 2006).
"A Llama's Tale", Space Westerns (27 January 2008).
"Elessa the Restless", in the anthology Barren Worlds (2008).
"Coyote and the Gamblers", in the anthology Return to Luna (2008).
"Ennui", Night to Dawn (April 2009).
"The Hunt", Jim Baen's Universe (February 2010).

Her first novel, Like Mayflies in a Stream, was published by Hadley Rille Books in 2009.

References

External links
 http://www.shaunaroberts.com

1956 births
Living people
People from Beavercreek, Ohio
American women short story writers
American short story writers
American medical writers
Women medical writers
American science fiction writers
Novelists from Ohio
Women science fiction and fantasy writers
American women novelists
American women non-fiction writers
21st-century American women